Solomon Sesugh Kwambe (born 30 September 1993) is a Nigerian footballer who plays as a defender for FC Tulsa in the USL Championship.

International career

He made his debut for Nigeria versus Niger in a friendly game on 15 August 2012. He was selected for Nigeria's squad at the 2013 FIFA Confederations Cup. 
Solomon Kwambe was called up to NIgeria's 23-man squad for the 2014 African Nations Championship.

References

External links 

1993 births
Nigerian footballers
Nigeria international footballers
Living people
2013 FIFA Confederations Cup players
Association football defenders
FC Tulsa players
People from Benue State
Plateau United F.C. players
Sunshine Stars F.C. players
Warri Wolves F.C. players
Lobi Stars F.C. players
Expatriate soccer players in the United States
Nigerian expatriate sportspeople in the United States
Nigerian expatriate footballers
USL Championship players
2014 African Nations Championship players
Nigeria A' international footballers